Anna-Lena Grönefeld and Katarina Srebotnik were the defending champions, but Grönefeld didn't participate that year.
Srebotnik chose to partner with Květa Peschke. They reached the final, where they lost to Renata Voráčová and Barbora Záhlavová-Strýcová 5–7, 6–7(6).

Seeds

Draw

Draw

References
 Doubles Draw

Generali Ladies Linz - Doubles